Long Beach High School may refer to:
Long Beach Polytechnic High School, serving Long Beach, California
Long Beach High School (Mississippi) serving Long Beach, Mississippi
Long Beach High School (New York), serving Long Beach, New York and the surrounding school district